Orlando Salvador Gutiérrez Leiva (born 19 August 1989) is a Chilean former professional football player and current manager who played as a defender.

Personal life
He is the older brother of the Chilean international footballer Felipe Gutiérrez.

Managerial career
While still he was a player of Deportes Puerto Montt, he graduated as a Football Manager at the INAF (Football National Institute of Chile) and ran a training workshop for youth female football players in July 2019.

On 2021, Gutiérrez became manager of Deportes Puerto Montt (women).

In 2022, he assumed as the assistant coach, and later as the head coach, in Quintero Unido.

References

External links
 
 Orlando Gutiérrez at playmakerstats.com (English version of ceroacero.es)

1989 births
Living people
People from Valparaíso Province
Chilean footballers
Coquimbo Unido footballers
Trasandino footballers
A.C. Barnechea footballers
Everton de Viña del Mar footballers
Ñublense footballers
Deportes Temuco footballers
Puerto Montt footballers
Tercera División de Chile players
Chilean Primera División players
Primera B de Chile players
Association football fullbacks
Chilean football managers